Will McLain Thompson  (August 30, 1870 – June 9, 1962) was a former professional baseball player who played pitcher in the Major Leagues for the 1892 Pittsburgh Pirates of the National League. He played college ball at the University of Pennsylvania. He also played in the New York State League in 1889, the Pennsylvania State League in 1893 and the Iron and Oil League in 1895. He later served in the Spanish–American War.

External links

1870 births
1962 deaths
Major League Baseball pitchers
Baseball players from Pennsylvania
19th-century baseball players
Pittsburgh Pirates players
Elmira Hottentots players
Johnstown Terrors players
Burials at Homewood Cemetery
American military personnel of the Spanish–American War